União Bandeirante Futebol Clube, usually known as União Bandeirante was a football (soccer) team from the city of Bandeirantes, in the state of Paraná, Brazil.

History
On November 15, 1964, União Bandeirante Futebol Clube was founded  as Usina Bandeirante Futebol Clube. Then the club and another club form the same city, Guarani, fused, and the new club was named União Bandeirante Futebol Clube.

In 2006, the club was deactivated by its owners, who are the sons of Serafim Meneghel, who was the club's patron.

Achievements
 Campeonato Paranaense Second Division:
 Winners (2): 1987, 1992'Stadium
União Bandeirante Futebol Clube's home matches are usually played at Comendador Luís Serafim Meneghel stadium (also known as Estádio Vila Maria), which has a maximum capacity of 8,000 people.

Mascots
There are three club mascots: the Caçula Milionário (Millionnaire Youngster), the Bêbado (Drunken Man) and the Caipira (Hillbilly)  The first mascot, the Caçula Milionári''o, was created in the 1960s.

Club colors
The club colors are black and white

References

External links

  Arquivo de Clubes

 
Association football clubs established in 1964
Association football clubs disestablished in 2006
Defunct football clubs in Paraná (state)
1964 establishments in Brazil
2006 disestablishments in Brazil